Zygomitus is a genus of green algae in the family Chaetophoraceae.

References

External links

Chaetophorales genera
Chaetophoraceae
Taxa named by Jean-Baptiste Édouard Bornet